2007 Auckland Open was a darts tournament that took place in Auckland, New Zealand on 22 September 2007.

Results

Men

Women

References

2007 in darts
2007 in New Zealand sport
Darts in New Zealand
September 2007 sports events in New Zealand